Maryna Aliaksandrauna Arzamasova (née Katowich, ; born 17 December 1987) is a Belarusian middle-distance runner. At the 2012 Summer Olympics, she competed in the Women's 800 metres. She won a bronze medal at the 2013 European Athletics Indoor Championships in the 800 metres. In August 2014, Arzamasova won 2014 European Athletics Championships in the 800 metres in a European leading time of 1:58.15. One year later she became world champion in the 800 metres at the 2015 World Championships in Athletics in Beijing.

In 2019, she won the silver medal in the team event at the 2019 European Games held in Minsk, Belarus.

Her mother, Ravilya Agletdinova was also a middle-distance runner and won the 1500 m European title in 1986 – an achievement which Arzamasava repeated.

In August 2019, Arzamasova was provisionally suspended after testing positive for the banned steroid-like substance LGD-4033.

References

External links

1987 births
Living people
Athletes from Minsk
Belarusian people of Tajikistani descent
Belarusian female middle-distance runners
Olympic athletes of Belarus
Athletes (track and field) at the 2012 Summer Olympics
Athletes (track and field) at the 2016 Summer Olympics
World Athletics Championships athletes for Belarus
World Athletics Championships medalists
European Athletics Championships medalists
Athletes (track and field) at the 2019 European Games
European Games medalists in athletics
European Games silver medalists for Belarus
World Athletics Championships winners